Giovanni Battista Vernici (died 1617) was an Italian painter.

He was born in Bologna. He was a pupil in the school of the Carracci. He painted religious 
and historical pictures for the churches and public buildings of Pesaro and Urbino, particularly in the latter city, where he was appointed principal painter to the Duke, in whose service he died.

References

16th-century births
1617 deaths
16th-century Italian painters
Italian male painters
17th-century Italian painters
Italian Baroque painters
Painters from Bologna